San Vicente Zapotec (in full San Vicente Coatlán Zapotec, also Southern Ejutla Zapotec), is a Zapotec language spoken in southern Oaxaca, Mexico, in the Ejutla District and San Vicente Coatlán.

It is 75% intelligible with San Baltázar Loxicha Zapotec, and 45% intelligible with Santo Domingo Coatlán Zapotec.

Phonology

Vowels

Consonants

References

Further reading

External links 
OLAC resources in and about the San Vicente Coatlán Zapotec language

Languages of Mexico
Oto-Manguean languages
Zapotec languages